The Association of Space Explorers is a non-profit organization with a membership composed of people who have completed at least one Earth orbit in space (above , as defined by the Fédération Aéronautique Internationale. It was founded in 1985, and its current membership stands at over 400 from 37 different countries. The organization provides a forum for the promotion of space exploration, as well as space science and engineering and environmental awareness.

Inspired by his friendship with author Michael Murphy and involvement in the Esalen Institute's Soviet-American Exchange Program, NASA astronaut Rusty Schweickart established the Association along with cosmonauts Alexei Leonov, Vitaly Sevastyanov, and Georgi Grechko.

Planetary Congress
The Planetary Congress of the Association of Space Explorers is an annual forum for ASE members. It is held in a different host country every year.

 34th Congress: Bursa, Turkey (2023)
 33rd Congress: Budapest, Hungary (2021)
 32nd Congress: Houston, Texas, USA (2019)
 31st Congress: Minsk, Belarus (2018)
 30th Congress: Toulouse, France (2017)
 29th Congress: Vienna, Austria (2016)
 28th Congress: Stockholm, Sweden (2015)
 27th Congress: Beijing, China (2014)
 26th Congress: Cologne, Germany (2013)
 25th Congress: Riyadh, Saudi Arabia (2012)
 24th Congress: Moscow, Russia (2011)
 23rd Congress: Kuala Lumpur, Malaysia (2010)
 22nd Congress: Prague, Czech Republic (2009)
 21st Congress: Seattle, Washington, USA (2008)
 20th Congress: Edinburgh, Scotland (2007)
 19th Congress: Salt Lake City, Utah, USA (2005)
 18th Congress: Tokyo, Japan (2003)
 17th Congress: Almaty, Kazakhstan (2001)
 16th Congress: Madrid, Spain (2000)
 15th Congress: Bucharest, Romania (1999)
 14th Congress: Brussels, Belgium (1998)
 13th Congress: San Jose, Costa Rica (1997)
 12th Congress: Montreal, Canada (1996)
 11th Congress: Warsaw, Poland (1995)
 10th Congress: Moscow/Lake Baikal, Russia (1994)
 9th Congress: Vienna, Austria (1993)
 8th Congress: Washington, DC, USA (1992)
 7th Congress: Berlin, Germany (1991)
 6th Congress: Groningen, The Netherlands (1990)
 5th Congress: Riyadh, Saudi Arabia (1989)
 4th Congress: Sofia, Bulgaria (1988)
 3rd Congress: Mexico City, Mexico (1987)
 2nd Congress: Budapest, Hungary (1986)
 1st Congress: Cernay, France (1985)

References

External links
Association of Space Explorers web site
ASE list of members

Space organizations
Scientific organizations established in 1985
Alexei Leonov
Rusty Schweickart